Alexander Harper Berkeley (born December 16, 1955) is an American actor. Since beginning his career in the early 1980s, he has appeared in over 200 film and television projects. His films include Terminator 2: Judgment Day (1991), Candyman (1992), Barb Wire (1996), Air Force One (1997), Gattaca (1997), and Shanghai Noon (2000). He also appeared in the crime drama Heat (1995) after being cast in L.A. Takedown (1989), an earlier rendition of the film's script, although he played two different characters on the two different films. On television, he headlined the Citytv psychological thriller The Booth at the End (2010–2012) and was a series regular on the Fox action drama 24 (2001–03) and The CW action thriller Nikita (2010–2012). As a guest star, Berkeley portrayed Sheriff Thomas McAllister on the CBS drama The Mentalist (2008–13) and Gregory on the AMC post-apocalyptic horror The Walking Dead (2016–18).

Early life and education
Berkeley was born in Brooklyn and raised in New Jersey. He is of English and Scottish descent. He attended Hampshire College, and worked in theaters at the Five Colleges, including Smith, Mount Holyoke, Amherst and the University of Massachusetts. He worked in regional and repertory theaters in addition to Off-Broadway in New York City. A casting agent spotted Berkeley in a play written by Reynolds Price called Early Dark and encouraged him to move to Hollywood.

Career

Berkeley began playing roles in 1981, with early appearances in M*A*S*H, Cagney & Lacey, Remington Steele, Miami Vice, Moonlighting, and The A-Team. His later television roles included The X-Files, CSI: Crime Scene Investigation, ER and Law & Order.

On screen, he has appeared in North Country, Terminator 2: Judgment Day, Mommie Dearest, Phoenix, Kick-Ass, A Few Good Men, The Rookie, Candyman, Apollo 13, Leaving Las Vegas, Gattaca, The Rock, Air Force One, Sid and Nancy, Amistad, Shanghai Noon, Barb Wire and Timecode. He appeared in the television film L.A. Takedown in 1989 and its 1995 acclaimed theatrical remake Heat, directed by Michael Mann. Several of his earlier roles were in films directed by Alex Cox.

In 2001, Berkeley became a recurring guest star (and later a series regular) on 24 in the role of George Mason, the head of the counter-terrorist unit. He portrayed the mysterious John Smith on the CBS drama Jericho.

In 2010, he received one of his best-known roles, Percy Rose on The CW action-thriller series Nikita. He portrayed the character as a series regular and de facto main antagonist of its first two seasons. He also played Sheriff Thomas McAllister on The Mentalist.

Berkeley portrayed Gregory on AMC's The Walking Dead as a guest star in season six and a series regular in season seven.

In 2018, he portrayed Peter Lockwood, the father of Sam Lockwood on the fourth season of Supergirl.

Voice acting
Berkeley provides voice-work and voice-over for several animated series, such as Aaahh!!! Real Monsters, Gargoyles and Teen Titans. He also voiced Quentin Beck / Mysterio on The Spectacular Spider-Man, Captain Atom in Superman/Batman: Public Enemies and Dr. Kirk Langstrom in Son of Batman.

Awards
In 2013, Berkeley won the Streamy Award "Best Male Performance, Drama" for his starring role in the acclaimed web series The Booth at the End.

Personal life
Berkeley is a make-up artist, painter and sculptor. He met actress Sarah Clarke on the set of 24 in 2001 and married her the following year. The two live with their daughters, Olwyn Harper (born in 2006) and Rowan Amara (born in 2010), in Maine and Los Angeles.

Filmography

Film

Television

Video games

References

External links

 
 
 A conversation with Xander Berkeley (archived copy)
 Xander Berkeley Interview at www.reviewgraveyard.com

1955 births
Living people
American male film actors
American male television actors
American male video game actors
American male voice actors
American people of English descent
American people of Scottish descent
Hampshire College alumni
Male actors from New Jersey
Male actors from New York City
People from Brooklyn
Streamy Award winners
20th-century American male actors
21st-century American male actors